Second Lieutenant Thomas Elliott (17 March 1898 – unknown) was a First World War British flying ace credited with eleven aerial victories, all while flying as an observer in the Bristol F.2 Fighter. The observer ace of Royal Air Force No. 62 Squadron scored the majority of his victories with George Everard Gibbons as pilot. Elliott later served as an instructor at an air gunnery school.

Background

Thomas Elliott, son of Thomas Herbert Elliott and his wife Elizabeth, was born on 17 March 1898 in Gateshead in the north-east of England. At the time of the 1901 census, he resided at 9 Affleck Street in Gateshead with his parents, and the family continued to live there ten years later. Elliott was one of two children, and the only one to survive childhood. His father's occupation was recorded as lead manufacturer's agent. Prior to the war, Elliott was employed as a clerk with the firm of Raine and Company in Newcastle.

Military career

Elliott enlisted with the military in April 1916, and received his commission to the No. 62 Squadron of the Royal Flying Corps on 12 March 1918. The Squadron has recently deployed to France and Elliott arrived not long after his new unit began operations from the aerodrome at Serny. Elliott was credited with eleven aerial victories while he was with No. 62 Squadron of the Royal Air Force, all of them from the Bristol F.2b Fighter, and nine of them with George Everard Gibbons as pilot. Gibbons was a 17-victory ace who was awarded the Military Cross, Distinguished Flying Cross, and French Legion of Honour. Gibbons had scored his first eight victories with Sidney Arthur William Knights as observer. However, Knights was hospitalised on 10 July 1918 and then was posted to the School of Aviation. Later, he was transferred to the Royal Air Force Armament School at RAF Uxbridge at the estate of Hillingdon House in Hillingdon in Greater London. Elliott, therefore, was the replacement for Knights. In September 1918, Elliott was transferred to No. 1 School of Air Gunnery, where he served as an instructor. He relinquished his commission on 21 February 1919.

List of aerial victories

Elliott's aerial victories were achieved while flying as an observer and are detailed below.

References

External links
 Aerodrome – Thomas Elliott

1898 births
Royal Air Force officers
Royal Flying Corps officers
Royal Air Force personnel of World War I
British World War I flying aces
People from Gateshead
Year of death missing
Recipients of the Legion of Honour
Military personnel from County Durham